Mr Tompkins is the title character in a series of four popular science books by the physicist George Gamow. The books are structured as a series of dreams in which Mr Tompkins enters alternative worlds where the physical constants have radically different values from those they have in the real world. Gamow aims to use these alterations to explain modern scientific theories.

Mr Tompkins' adventures begin when he chooses to spend the afternoon of a bank holiday attending a lecture on the theory of relativity.  The lecture proves less comprehensible than he had hoped and he drifts off to sleep and enters a dream world in which the speed of light is a mere .  This becomes apparent to him through the fact that passing cyclists are subject to a noticeable Lorentz–FitzGerald contraction. Mr Tompkins becomes acquainted with the Professor delivering the lectures and ultimately marries the Professor's daughter, Maud.  Later chapters in the books deal with atomic structure (Mr Tompkins spends time as a conduction electron, returning to consciousness when he is annihilated in an encounter with a positron), and thermodynamics (the Professor expounds an analogy between the second law of thermodynamics and the bias towards the casino in gambling before being confounded by a local reversal of the second law through the intervention of Maxwell's demon who has introduced himself to Maud in one of her dreams). Mr Tompkins' initials are 'C.G.H.' which stand for c (the speed of light), G (the constant of gravitation) and h (Planck's constant). Following their marriage Maud refers to him as 'Cyril'.

Later books in the series tackled biology and advanced cosmology.

In 2010 the first volume of a proposed ten-issue comic book series, The Adventures of Mr. Tompkins, was created by Igor Gamow, George Gamow's son, and illustrator Scorpio Steele. In the book Tompkins learns about relativity from Albert Einstein, radioactivity from Marie Curie and the structure of the atom from Ernest Rutherford. A second volume, in which Tompkins meets Charles Darwin, Gregor Mendel and James Watson, was published in July 2011.

Main belt asteroid 12448 Mr. Tompkins is named after Tompkins.

The Scientific Background to the 2017 Nobel Prize in Chemistry begins by citing Mr Tompkins Inside Himself.

The University of Akron produced a film adaption of this story starring Prof. Alan Neville Gent, which can be viewed here.

Books in the series
 1940: Mr Tompkins in Wonderland, originally published 1938 in serial form in Discovery magazine (UK)
 1945: Mr Tompkins Explores the Atom
 1965: Mr Tompkins in Paperback, combines Mr Tompkins in Wonderland with Mr Tompkins Explores the Atom
 1953: Mr Tompkins Learns the Facts of Life, about biology
 1967: Mr. Tompkins Inside Himself, coauthor Martynas Yčas revised Mr Tompkins Learns the Facts of Life giving a broader view of biology, including recent developments in molecular biology
 1993: Canto edition Mr Tompkins in Paperback, forward by Roger Penrose, Cambridge University Press
 1999: The New World of Mr Tompkins, coauthor Russell Stannard updated Mr Tompkins in Paperback ( hardcover)

Notes

References
George Gamow, Mr Tompkins in Wonderland, first published in 1939
George Gamow, Mr Tompkins explores the atom, first published in 1944
George Gamow, Mr Tompkins learns the facts of life, Cambridge University Press, 1953
George Gamow and Martynas Ycas, Mr Tompkins inside himself: Adventures in the new biology, Viking Press, 1967
George Gamow, Roger Penrose (Foreword), Mr Tompkins in Paperback (Omnibus of Mr Tompkins in Wonderland and Mr Tompkins Explores the Atom), Cambridge University Press, 1993, 
George Gamow, Russell Stannard (Editor), Michael Edwards (Illustrator), The New World of Mr Tompkins, Cambridge University Press, 2001 (revised and updated edition), 
Igor Gamow (Writer), Scorpio Steele (Illustrator), The Adventures of Mr. Tompkins, CreateSpace, 2010 
Igor Gamow (Writer), Scorpio Steele (Illustrator), The Adventures of Mr. Tompkins, No. 2, CreateSpace, 2011

Further reading
 

Thompson, Mr
Thompson, Mr.
Series of books
Popular physics books